Nyctelius is a genus of skippers in the family Hesperiidae.

References

Natural History Museum Lepidoptera genus database

Hesperiini
Butterflies of Trinidad and Tobago
Hesperiidae genera